Gamma Canis Minoris (γ Canis Minoris) is a binary star system in the equatorial constellation Canis Minor. Its orange colour is obvious when seen through binoculars. The system is visible to the naked eye with a combined apparent visual magnitude of +4.33. Based upon an annual parallax shift of 10.25 mas as seen from Earth, this system is located about 320 light years from the Sun.

This spectroscopic binary star system has an orbital period of 389.31 days, a semimajor axis of 1.48 AU, and an eccentricity of 0.2586. Their variable radial velocity was discovered by H. M. Reese in 1902 at Lick Observatory. Both components are evolved, K-type giant stars, most likely on their first ascent along the red giant branch. The primary, component A, has a stellar classification of K4 III while the secondary, component B, may be K1: III.

References

K-type giants
Spectroscopic binaries
Canis Minoris, Gamma
Canis Minor
Durchmusterung objects
Canis Minoris, 04
058972
036284
2854